David William Thomas  (born May 20, 1949) is a Canadian actor, comedian and television writer. He is best known for being one half of the duo Bob and Doug McKenzie with Rick Moranis. He appeared as Doug McKenzie on SCTV, for which he won a Primetime Emmy Award out of two nominations, and in the film Strange Brew (1983), which he also co-directed. As a duo, they made two albums, The Great White North and Strange Brew, the former gaining them a Grammy Award nomination and a Juno Award.

His other notable acting credits include Stripes (1981), Love at Stake (1987), Moving (1988), Coneheads (1993) and Rat Race (2001). He provided the voice of Tuke in Brother Bear (2003), and Brother Bear 2 (2006), and is also known for playing Russell Norton in the TV series Grace Under Fire (1993-1998).

Early life
David William Thomas was born May 20, 1949, in St. Catharines, Ontario. He is the eldest son of British parents, Moreen Duff Muir (May 4, 1928 - May 18, 2022), a church organist for thirty years originally from Glasgow, Scotland, and composer of church music, and John E. Thomas (1926–1996), a medical ethicist from Merthyr Tydfil, Wales who was head of the Philosophy Department at McMaster University, and the author of several books. Dave's younger brother, Ian, is a Canadian singer-songwriter. 

The family moved temporarily to Durham, North Carolina, where his father attended Duke University and earned a PhD in philosophy. The family moved back to Dundas, Ontario, in 1961, where Dave Thomas attended Dundas District high school, and later graduated with an honours Bachelor of Arts degree in English literature from McMaster University in Hamilton, Ontario.

Career

Starting his career as a copywriter at ad agency McCann Erickson in 1974, he became the head writer of the Coca-Cola account in Canada within a year. After watching a Second City stage show in Toronto, and while suffering from self-described "boredom" in his advertising work, he auditioned for the Second City troupe and was chosen as a performer. He was a cast member of the Toronto production of Godspell, along with Victor Garber, Martin Short, Eugene Levy, Gilda Radner, and Andrea Martin. Paul Shaffer  was the musical director. 

He first achieved fame as a cast member of the Canadian TV comedy series SCTV, joining Godspell castmates Levy, Martin and later Short, plus Rick Moranis, John Candy, Harold Ramis, Catherine O'Hara and others. Notable characters on the show include Doug McKenzie of beer-swilling brothers Bob and Doug McKenzie, editorialist Bill Needle, Scottish scone-chef/bluesman Angus Crock, motor-mouthed TV ad announcer Harvey K-Tel, Lowery organist/curio pitchman Tex Boil and the "Cruising Gourmet".

Thomas's first movie was Home to Stay, directed by Delbert Mann, in which Thomas played in a scene with Hollywood legend Henry Fonda. He then wrote, co-directed, and starred in the Bob & Doug McKenzie feature film Strange Brew. Soon after, he wrote for and acted in The New Show, produced by Lorne Michaels during his hiatus from Saturday Night Live. Short-lived, this show featured a powerhouse writing staff including Thomas along with Buck Henry, George Meyer, Jack Handey, Al Franken, Tom Davis, Valri Bromfield and Steve Martin. Thomas tried his hand at network television hour-long shows in 1986 when he wrote and co-executive produced Steel Collar Man for CBS. The pilot was produced but did not go to series. 

In 1988, Thomas wrote another hour long show for CBS, B Men, which was back ordered, but Thomas took a directing job at Paramount, which caused the network to drop the series. He reportedly introduced John Travolta and Kelly Preston while directing them in the Paramount film The Experts.

He wrote for, produced, and starred in The Dave Thomas Comedy Show (1990). In 1991, he starred in the Showtime comedy, Public Enemy #2. In 1992, he tried his hand at reality TV and co-executive produced ABC's America's Funniest People with Vin Di Bona, but left after thirteen weeks to appear in the film Coneheads. 

In 1993, he officially co-starred in ABC's Grace Under Fire with Brett Butler and Tom Poston and continued with the show for 5 seasons. In 1995 Thomas starred in ABC TV movie Picture Perfect with Mary Page Keller and Richard Karn. In 1995 Thomas tried his hand at TV Game shows, produced a pilot of a game show called Family Challenge for ABC. When ABC did not pick up the series, Thomas sold Family Challenge to the Family Channel, where he produced 144 episodes of the show spread over 2 seasons.  In 1996, Thomas played the title role in the Fox TV movie Mr. Foster's Field Trip aka Kidz in the Wood with Julia Duffy. 

In 1996, he wrote the book SCTV: Behind the Scenes (McClelland & Stewart, publishers). From 1999-2002, he voiced various roles on the animated series Mission Hill. 

Thomas co-starred in the Paramount feature Rat Race. As of 2001, Thomas has been the Executive Creative Director of Animax Entertainment, an animation studio based officially in Culver City, California. In 2001-2002 Thomas appeared with Eugene Levy and Martin Short on Short's show Primetime Glick as Bob Hope (an impression he had first developed for SCTV with great success). In 2002, he co-starred with Jason Priestley, Dave Foley and Ewen Bremner in Fancy Dancing. The next year he played a lead role in Beethoven's 5th. In 2003, he directed a hospital comedy feature film entitled Whitecoats, which he also wrote. As of 2004, Thomas was on the official Advisory Committee for the Comedy program at Humber College, the only such diploma program in the world. In 2004, he and Moranis reprised the voices of the McKenzie Brothers in Disney's animated feature Brother Bear.

Thomas has had a long career doing voices for animation including Animaniacs, Duckman, CatDog, The Adventures of Tarzan, Justice League of America and multiple roles on The Simpsons(Rex Banner), King of the Hill and Family Guy. In 2005, he had a guest stint as Charlize Theron's "Uncle Trevor" on Fox's Arrested Development. In 2006, he reprised his voice role in Brother Bear 2 and appeared as himself in the feature film The Aristocrats. He began production on ArnoldSpeaks.com, a video blog, as the voice of Arnold Schwarzenegger; Animax Entertainment won an Emmy for a broadband animated series produced for ESPN, Off Mikes.

In 2007, Thomas and Rick Moranis reprised their roles as Bob and Doug McKenzie in a one-hour special, Bob & Doug McKenzie's Two-Four Anniversary, for CBC Television. The show featured cameos from McKenzie celeb fans like Ben Stiller, Dave Foley, Tom Green, Paul Shaffer, Andy Dick, Matt Groening, Barry Pepper, Martin Short, and Geddy Lee. Former Prime Minister of Canada Paul Martin was the host. In 2008, Thomas revived Bob and Doug McKenzie in a new animated series, Bob & Doug. While Thomas reprises the character of Doug in the new series, Moranis chose not to voice the character of Bob, which instead is voiced by Dave Coulier. Moranis is, however, involved in the series as an executive producer.

In November 2009, Thomas received an Honorary Doctor of Letters from his alma mater McMaster University and gave the fall convocation speech. In 2010 Animax continued to produce branded entertainment, advertising and digital shorts for corporations like Disney, Warner Brothers, NBC Universal, and Kodak. In 2011, Thomas's company Animax produced another animated show for MTV entitled Big Box along with numerous Internet shorts such as Life With Dad.

In 2012 and 2013 Thomas guest starred in the dramatic shows Perception and Bones as well as comedy shows Comedy Bang! Bang! and How I Met Your Mother.  In addition in 2013 Thomas voiced the recurring role of Jeff Foxworthy's father Jesco in the CMT show Bounty Hunters.

Thomas joined the writing staff of the Fox crime drama television series Bones beginning in 2013. Thomas worked for two seasons on Bones, writing several episodes and working on staff as consulting producer for two seasons.

In 2015 Thomas joined the writing staff of NBC's The Blacklist as a consulting producer.

In 2020 life-sized statues of Thomas and Rick Moranis as their characters Bob and Doug McKenzie was put in place at the ICE District Sports Arena in Edmonton, Alberta.

Also in 2020, the Governor-General of Canada announced that Thomas was being appointed to the Order of Canada, Canada's highest civilian award.

In 2021, Thomas and Max Allan Collins teamed to write a sci-fi mystery novel, The Many Lives of Jimmy Leighton.

Awards
 ACTRA AWARD for Best Variety Performer in 1978.
 Emmy Award in 1981 for Outstanding Writing in a Variety or Musical Program.
 Juno Award for Best Canadian Comedy Album of the Year in 1981.
 Grammy Award for Best Comedy Album Nominated in 1983
 Juno Award in 1983-84 for Best Comedy Album of the Year.
 People's Choice Award with the cast of Grace Under Fire in 1994.
  Earl Grey Award in 1995 for his work on SCTV.
 In 2002, he and the cast of the SCTV received a star on Canada's Walk of Fame.
 Emmy Award in 2006 - Outstanding Achievement in Content for Non-Traditional Delivery Platforms – Thomas and his company Animax won this award for ESPN's Off Mikes
 Lifetime Achievement Award from Humber College Toronto in November 2009.
 Honorary Doctor of Letters from McMaster University in 2009
  AMPIA Special Achievement Award from Alberta Media Production Industries Association in 2013 
 Honoured at the 2013 AMPIA Awards for his contribution to film and television.
In 2020, Dave Thomas was appointed as a member of the Order of Canada.
 In 2020, life-sized statues of Dave Thomas and Rick Moranis as their characters Bob and Doug McKenzie were put in place at the ICE District Sports Arena in Edmonton, Alberta.

Partial filmography

SCTV (1976–1982, TV Series) various, including Doug McKenzie
Home to Stay Television MOW (1978, TV Movie) as Petrie
Riel (1979, TV Movie) as Cdn. Captain
Deadly Companion (1980) as Howie
Stripes (1981) as M.C.
Strange Brew (1983, also co-director) as Doug McKenzie
The Get-Along Gang (1984, pilot episode) as Leland Lizard
The New Show (1984, TV Series)
Sesame Street Presents: Follow That Bird (1985) as Sam Sleaze
My Man Adam (1985) as Jerry Swit
In the Mood (1987) as Bob Hope (voice, uncredited)
Love at Stake (1987) as Mayor Upton
Moving (1988) as Gary Marcus
Rocket Boy (1989, TV Movie) as Rocket Boy
The Experts (1989, director)
The Dave Thomas Comedy Show (1990, TV Series) as Himself
Parker Lewis Can't Lose (1991, TV Series) as Lionel Tower
Boris and Natasha: The Movie (1992, TV Movie) as Boris Badenov
Cold Sweat (1993) as Larry
Coneheads (1993) as Highmaster
Ghost Mom (1993, director)
Grace Under Fire (1993–1998, TV Series) as Russell Norton
Public Enemy Number Two (1993) as Wynn Dalton / Dwayne Gary Steckler
Splitting Heirs (1993)
The Larry Sanders Show (1994)
Kidz in the Woods (1995)
Picture Perfect (1995, TV Movie) as Ernie Barrett
The Simpsons (1997–2006, TV Series) as Bob Hope / Rex Banner
The Red Green Show (1994–1995, TV Series) as Ben Franklin
Pippi Longstocking (1997) as Thunder-Karlsson (voice)
King of the Hill (1998–2007, TV Series) as Lane Pratley / Gretta (voice)
Cosby (1999, TV Series) as Tully
Most Valuable Primate (2000) as Willy Drucker
Te wu mi cheng (2001) (voice)
Rat Race (2001) as Harold Grisham
That '70s Show (2001, TV Series) as Chris
Space Ghost Coast to Coast (2001, TV Series) as Himself
Fancy Dancing (2002) as Uncle Billy Gemmill
New Beachcombers (2002, TV Movie) as Dave McGonigal
Who's Your Daddy? (2003) as Carl Hughes
Brother Bear (2003) as Tuke (voice)
Beethoven's 5th (2003) as Freddy Kablinski
Intern Academy (2004) as Dr. Omar Olson
Love on the Side (2004) as Red
Santa's Slay (2005) as Pastor Timmons
Arrested Development (2005, TV Series) as Trevor
The Aristocrats (2005) as Himself
Brother Bear 2 (2006, video) as Tuke (voice)
Weeds (2006, TV Series)
Bob & Doug McKenzie's Two-Four Anniversary (2007, TV Movie documentary) as Doug McKenzie
Bob & Doug (2009, TV Series) as Doug McKenzie
Popzilla (2009, TV Series) (voice)
Pound Puppies (2011–2012, TV Series) as Agent Todd (voice)
Perception (2012, TV Series) as Bill Duffy
Comedy Bang Bang (2012–2015, TV Series) as Burt Aukerman
Bones (2013–2017, TV Series) as Dick Scarn / Andrew Jursic
How I Met Your Mother (2013, TV Series) as Chuck Gerussi
Bounty Hunters (2013, TV Series) as Jesco / Actor
The Blacklist (2015–2016, TV Series)

Celebrity impersonations on SCTV

Aleksandr Solzhenitsyn
Al Pacino (as Steve Burns)
Arnold Schwarzenegger
Art Linkletter
Bennett Cerf
Benny Hill
Bob Hope
Carl Sagan

DeForest Kelley
Fred Travalena (as Jim Nabors)
G. Gordon Liddy
Hal Holbrook (as James Whitmore)
James Herriot
Jerry Brown
John Simon
Ken Osmond

Lee Iacocca
Liberace
Lloyd Bridges
Michael Caine
Neil Simon
Orson Welles
Phil Donahue
Randy Newman

Red Buttons
Richard Harris
Robert Duvall
Rodney Dangerfield
Roger Ebert
Sean Connery
Walter Cronkite

Awards and nominations

References

External links
 
 
 Entry at thecanadianencyclopedia.ca
 Dave Thomas page at Godspell.ca (archive)
 Animax Entertainment
 Dave Thomas on 'The Hour'

1949 births
Living people
20th-century Canadian male actors
21st-century Canadian male actors
Canadian emigrants to the United States
Canadian male comedians
Canadian male film actors
Canadian male television actors
Canadian male television writers
Canadian male voice actors
Canadian people of Scottish descent
Canadian people of Welsh descent
Canadian sketch comedians
Canadian television personalities
Canadian television writers
Film directors from Ontario
Juno Award winners
Male actors from Ontario
McMaster University alumni
People from Dundas, Ontario
People from St. Catharines
Primetime Emmy Award winners
Members of the Order of Canada
People from Oak Park, California
Comedians from Ontario
20th-century Canadian comedians
21st-century Canadian comedians